Colours of Ostrava, or simply Colours, is a multi-genre festival, the biggest international music festival in the Czech Republic and one of the biggest music events in Central Europe, held every summer since 2002 in Ostrava, the third biggest city in the country. Colours features 16 stages including 4 big open-air stages (the main one with a capacity of 15,000), 6 indoor stages, a theatre stage, a workshop stage, a kids' stage, a cinema and live discussions. It features performers from all major popular music genres as well as avant-garde music and world music.

Until 2012 Colours took place in the well-known Silesian Ostrava Castle entertainment district and on the Černá louka Fairgrounds, as well as at other places in the city centre. In 2010, attendance exceeded 30,000 and it became the first festival in the Czech Republic to be sold out a month in advance. In 2011, the festival celebrated its 10th anniversary, being held from 14 to 17 July. Since 2012 the festival takes place on recultivated brownfields in the Vítkovice city district.

History 
2002 (1st year): More than 300 musicians in 50 bands and 24 DJs, out of which 14 were from abroad, including: Senses (FR), Transsylvanians (HU + DE), Uado Taraban (PL), Carantuohill (PL), Africa Mma. The festival took place at 6 scenes (3 outdoor and 3 indoor). About 8,000 visitors attended Colours of Ostrava in 2002.

2003 (2nd year): More than 500 musicians in 60 bands and 27 DJs, out of which 16 were from abroad, including: Goran Bregovic & Wedding and Funeral Band (Eastern Europe), Geoffrey Oryema (Uganda), Kosheen (GB), Oi-Va-Voi (GB), Sheva (Israel), Te Vaka (Polynesia), ZikFa (FR), Drum Machina (PL), Hey (PL), Korai Öröm (HU). The festival took place at 9 scenes (6 outdoor and 4 indoor). About 9,000 visitors attended Colours of Ostrava in 2003.

2004 (3rd year): 384 musicians in 64 bands and 22 DJs, out of which 26 were from abroad, including: Natacha Atlas (GB), Bob Geldof (IE), Rachid Taha (Algeria/FR), Zion Train (GB), So Kalmery (DR Congo), Duoud (Algeria/FR), Kanjar'Oc (FR), Urban Trad (B), Oyster band (GB), B. Traore (Mali), Elliot Murphy (USA/FR), UR'IA (BY), Haydamaky (UA). The festival took place at 7 scenes (4 outdoor and 3 indoor). About 10,000 visitors attended Colours of Ostrava in 2004.

2005 (4th year): More than 700 musicians in more than 100 bands and 25 DJs, out of which 30 were from abroad, including: George Clinton Parliament/Funkadelic (USA), Asian Dub Foundation (GB), Fun-Da-Mental (GB), Transglobal Underground (GB), Alabama 3 (GB), Mariza (PT), The Klezmatics (USA), Farlanders (RU), Septeto Nacional (CU), Enzo Avitabile (IT), Daara J, Alif (SEN). The festival took place at 8 scenes (6 outdoor and 2 indoor). About 12,000 visitors attended Colours of Ostrava in 2005.

2006 (5th year): More than 750 musicians in 123 bands, out of which 33 were from abroad, including: Salif Keita, Robert Plant, Gogol Bordello, Resin Dogs, The Frames, Delirious?, Woven Hand, Cheikh Lo, Senses, Rabasa, Oojami, Mariem Hasan, Titi Robin, Mojmir Novakovic, Dubioza, Zakopower, Bingui Jaa Jammy, Zagar, Sergnet Peper, Funset, Canaman, Stephan Micus. The festival took place at 12 scenes (6 outdoor and 6 indoor). About 16,000 visitors attended Colours of Ostrava in 2006.

2007 (6th year): The festival featured e.g.: Marianne Faithfull, Mando Diao, Bajofondo Tango Club, Gipsy Kings, Coldcut, Yungchen Lhamo, Vinicio Capossela, Orange Blossom, The Idan Raichel project, Ba Cissoko, Goran Bregovic, Richard Bona, Balkan Beat Box, Watcha clan, J. Gasparyan, Salsa Celtica, Alfonso X, OSB Crew, CocoRosie, David Hykes, Martyna Jakubowicz, Saucy Monky. In 2007, for the first time, the attendance of Colours of Ostrava was over 20,000 visitors.

2008 (7th year): The festival featured e.g.: Sinéad O'Connor, Goldfrapp, Happy Mondays, Jan Garbarek Group and Trilok Gurtu, Gogol Bordello, Habib Koite, Dandy Warhols, Koop, Lou Rhodes, Shantel and Bucovina Club Orkestar, Daby Toure, Hawkwind, Noa, Sergant Garcia, Inga Liljestrom, Craig Adams and The Higher Dimension Praise, Recycler, Tim Eriksem, Tanya Tagaq, Les Boukakes, Irfan, Deva Premal and Miten, Tosh Meets Marley, A Filleta and others. About 22,000 visitors attended.

2009 (8th year): 99 music bands (35 from abroad), including: Ahn Trio, Asian Dub Foundation, David Byrne, Jamie Cullum, Jape, Johnny Clegg, Jon Anderson, KTU, LA-33, Michael Nyman Band, Morcheeba, Maceo Parker, Mamady Keita, Mercury Rev, N.O.H.A., Seun Kuti & Egypt 80, Speed Caravan, Stereo MCs, Diwan Project, Nina Stiller, Dikanda, Glenn Kaiser Band, The Violet Burning, Terl Bryant & Red Drum, Svjata Vatra, and many others. The attendance was about 25,000 visitors.

2010 (9th year): More than 100 bands (39 from abroad), including: Iggy Pop & The Stooges, The Cranberries, Regina Spektor, Afro Celt Sound System, The Gypsy Queens and Kings, Jaga Jazzist, El Gran Silencio, Erik Truffaz Paris Project, Porcupine Tree, Dulsori, Peyoti for President, Alamaailman Vasarat, Huong Thanh, A Hawk and a Hacksaw, Valravn, Maria Kalaniemi, Nive Nielsen, Mor Karbasi, Oy Division, Acoustic Ladyland, Iarla O'Lionáird, Alejandro Toledo and the Magic Tombolinos, Mokoomba, Open Hands, The Proclaimers, Sophie Hunger, Zion Train, Dubmarine, Zagar, Etna Kontrabande, Marky Ramone's Blitzkrieg, Don Blackman, Fernando Saunders, José James, Lord Bishop Rocks, New York Ska Jazz Ensemble, Thierry Arpino & Essouna, Brooklyn Funk Essentials. The attendance was almost 30,000 visitors, and for the first time, the festival was sold out before the opening.

2011 (10th year):
Grinderman (UK), Salif Keita (Mali), Public Image Ltd (UK), Yann Tiersen (France), Clannad (Ireland), Balkan Brass Battle (Romania/Serbia), Swans (US), Apollo 440 (UK), Brendan Perry (UK), Santigold (US), The Horrors (UK), Semi Precious Weapons (US), The Herbaliser (UK), Blackfield (UK/Israel), Lisa Hannigan (Ireland), Joan As Police Woman (US), Andreya Triana (UK), N.O.H.A. – Circus Underground (Spain, Germany, USA, CR), Mono (Japonsko), Dubioza kolektiv (Bosnia and Herzegovina), Luísa Maita (Brazil), Bomba Estéreo (Colombia), La Shica (Spain), SMOD (Mali), Sam Karpienia (France), Stephan Micus (Germany), David Hykes (US), Moana and the Tribe (New Zealand), L'Orchestre International du Vetex (Belgium), Aranis (Belgium), Frank Yamma (Australia), Oudaden (Marocco), Anomie Belle (US), Cedric Watson (US), Electric Wire Hustle (New Zealand), Fernando Saunders (US), Hazmat Modine (US), Nils Petter Molvær / Jan Bang (US), Miles Benjamin Anthony Robinson (US), Paramount Styles (US), Rain Machine (US), Roy Ayers (US), Tortured Soul (US) and many others.

2012 (11th year):
Alanis Morissette (Canada), Bobby McFerrin (USA), The Flaming Lips (USA), ZAZ (France), Janelle Monáe (US), Antony and the Johnsons (UK/USA), Rufus Wainwright and his Band (US / Canada), Animal Collective (USA), Infected Mushroom (Israel / USA), Mogwai (UK), Parov Stelar Band (Austria), Kronos Quartet / Kimmo Pohjonen / Samuli Kosminen - Uniko (USA / Finland), Fink (UK), Hugh Masekela (JAR), Ibrahim Maalouf (Libanon), Staff Benda Bilili (Kongo), Orquesta Típica Fernández Fierro (Argentina), Banco de Gaia (UK), Celso Piña (Mexico), Hjaltalín (Iceland), Portico Quartet (UK), Tamikrest (Mali), Katzenjammer (Norway), Quique Neira & Najavibes (Chile), Gangpol & Mit (France), Ewert and The Two Dragons (Estonia), GaBlé (France), R.U.T.A.(Poland), Acollective (Israel), Shtetl Superstars (UK, Germany, Italy, Ukraine, Israel), Barons Of Tang (Australia), Bassekou Kouyate & Ngoni Ba (Mali), Euzen (Denmark), Dánjal (Faerské ostrovy / Denmark), Sauti Sol (Keňa), Árstíðir (Iceland), Rubik (Finland), Lindigo (Réunion / France), Ensemble Yaman (Israel), Sea and Air (Germany), The Creole Choir of Cuba (Cuba / Haiti), Svjata Vatra (Estonia/Ukraine) and others...

2013 (12th year):
Sigur Rós (Iceland), Jamie Cullum (UK), The xx (UK), The Knife (Sweden), Tomahawk (USA), Damien Rice (Ireland), Bonobo (UK), Asaf Avidan (Israel), Woodkid (France), Dub FX (Australia), Devendra Banhart (US), Tiken Jah Fakoly (Ivory Coast), Rokia Traoré (Mali), Inspiral Carpets (UK), Jon Hassell (USA), Sara Tavares (Portugal), Submotion Orchestra (UK), Acoustic Africa (Ivory Coast, Kamerun, Mali), Fanfara Tirana meets Transglobal Underground (UK / Albánie), Balkan Beat Box (Israel), Botanica (USA), Girls Against Boys (USA), The Bots (USA), Dr Meaker (UK), Maria Peszek (Poland),Sam Lee (UK), Aziz Sahmaoui & University of Gnawa (Morocco), Savina Yannatou & Primavera en Salonic (Greece), Dhafer Youssef (Tunisia), Amparo Sánchez (Spain), Kumbia Queers (Argentina), Anna Maria Jopek (Poland), Mama Marjas (Italy), Irie Révoltés (Germany), Duke Special (Severní Ireland), Mich Gerber (Switzerland), Gin Ga (Austria), Russkaja (Austria).

2014 (13th year):
Robert Plant (UK), The National (USA), ZAZ (France), MGMT (USA), Bastille (UK), John Newman (UK), John Butler Trio (Australia), Angélique Kidjo (Benin), Chet Faker (Australia), Emilíana Torrini (Iceland), Trentemøller (Denmark), Seasick Steve (USA), Jamie Woon (UK), The Asteroids Galaxy Tour (Denmark), Ólafur Arnalds (Iceland), MØ (Denmark), John Grant (USA), Shaka Ponk (France), Charles Bradley And His Extraordinaires (USA), Goat (Sweden), Les Tambours du Bronx (France), Hidden Orchestra (UK), Korben Dallas (Slovakia)

2015 (14th year):
Björk (Iceland), Kasabian (UK), Rudimental (UK), St. Vincent (USA), Mika (UK), Caribou (Canada), Clean Bandit (UK), José González (Sweden), The Cinematic Orchestra (UK), Rodrigo y Gabriela (Mexico), Klangkarussell (Austria), HVOB (Austria), Swans (USA)

2016 (15th year): 130 bands (76 from abroad, 54 from the Czech Republic), including: Tame Impala (Australia), Of Monsters and Men (Iceland), M83 (France), Passenger (UK), Thievery Corporation, Kodaline (Ireland), The Vaccines (UK), Caro Emerald (The Netherlands), Underworld (UK), Sharon Kovacs (The Netherlands), Monkey Business (Czech Republic), Mydy Rabycad (Czech Republic), Lake Malawi, Barbora Poláková (Czech Republic), Ohm Square (Czech Republic), Republic of Two (Czech Republic), DVA (Czech Republic), Ivan Hlas Trio (Czech Republic), Už jsme doma (Czech Republic), Terne Čhave (Czech Republic), Korben Dallas (Slovakia) and others.

2017 (16th year): first year which was sold out. In total 20 stages with 132 bands (80 from abroad and 52 from the Czech Republic) including: Imagine Dragons (USA), alt-J (UK), Norah Jones (USA), Jamiroquai (UK), Midnight Oil (Australia), Moderat (Germany), Birdy (UK), LP (USA), Laura Mvula (UK), Benjamin Clementine (UK), Unkle (UK), Michael Kiwanuka (UK), Justice (France), Zrní (Czech Republic), Michal Hrůza (Czech Republic), Tata Bojs (Czech Republic), Aneta Langerová (Czech Republic), Nouvelle Vague (France), Walking on Cars (Ireland), Faada Freddy (Senegal) and others...

References

External links 

 
 Colours of Ostrava on Sonicbids

Ostrava
World music festivals
Rock festivals in the Czech Republic
Recurring events established in 2002
Tourist attractions in the Moravian-Silesian Region
2002 establishments in the Czech Republic
Summer events in the Czech Republic